Andrew J. Cohen is an American screenwriter and film director, best known for writing the 2014 film Neighbors along with Brendan O'Brien. His feature-length directorial debut, The House, was released on June 30, 2017.

Early life and education
Cohen and his screenwriter friend Brendan O'Brien were both born and grew up in Scarsdale, New York, and both went to Scarsdale Middle School, where they became friends in the sixth grade. Cohen graduated in film studies from Yale University.

Career 
In 2014, Cohen co-wrote the script for the comedy film Neighbors along with O'Brien, starring Zac Efron and Seth Rogen. The film was directed by Nicholas Stoller and released on May 9, 2014.

Cohen and O'Brien also co-wrote the scripts for two 2016 films, Neighbors 2: Sorority Rising and Mike and Dave Need Wedding Dates.

Cohen made his directing debut with the 2017 comedy film The House, which he co-wrote with O'Brien.

Filmography 
 Neighbors (2014, writer)
 Neighbors 2: Sorority Rising (2016, writer)
 Mike and Dave Need Wedding Dates (2016, writer)
 The House (2017, director, writer)

References

External links 
 

Living people
American male screenwriters
Film directors from New York (state)
Yale University alumni
American film producers
Year of birth missing (living people)
Screenwriters from New York (state)
21st-century American screenwriters
21st-century American male writers